Diota rostrata is a species of moth of the subfamily Arctiinae first described by Wallengren in 1860. It is found in South Africa, Eswatini, Zimbabwe, Kenya and Ethiopia.

The length of the forewings is 13–16 mm. Adults are cream coloured with brown mottling and darker shades as well as a few black dots in the basal, medial and post medial areas on the forewings.

The larvae feed on a wide range of plants including Senecio species (including S. angulatus, S. tamoides and S. oxyodontus), Delairea odorata, Mikaniopsis cissampelina, Kleinia abyssinica, Carthamus tinctorius, Daucus carota and Bidens pilosa. They feed singly and moved to sheltered positions during the day. When disturbed, they drop off their host plant, curl up and remain motionless. Pupation takes place in a loose cocoon which is attached to any object in the immediate vicinity.

References

Moths described in 1860
Nyctemerina
Moths of Sub-Saharan Africa

Africa